Kononenko is a rural locality (a khutor) in Uspensky Selsoviet of Akhtubinsky District, Astrakhan Oblast, Russia. The population was 8 as of 2010.

Geography 
Kononenko is located 23 km southeast of Akhtubinsk (the district's administrative centre) by road.

References 

Rural localities in Akhtubinsky District